Point Isabel is an unincorporated community and census-designated place (CDP) in central Green Township, Grant County, Indiana, United States. It lies at the intersection of State Roads 13 and 26. As of the 2010 census it had a population of 91.

A post office was established at Point Isabel in 1859, and remained in operation until it was discontinued in 1911.

Geography
State Road 13 leads north  to Swayzee and south  to Elwood, while State Road 26 leads east  to Fairmount and west  to the southern outskirts of Kokomo.

Demographics

Education
Residents are in the Madison-Grant United School Corporation. Madison-Grant High School is the zoned high school.

References

External links
 Point Isabel Weather from the National Weather Service.

Census-designated places in Grant County, Indiana
Census-designated places in Indiana